Samuel Parker House may refer to:

Samuel Parker House, Coventry, Connecticut, of Parker-Hutchinson Farm, listed on the National Register of Historic Places, in Tolland County
Samuel Parker House (Reading, Massachusetts), NRHP-listed, in Middlesex County

See also
Parker House (disambiguation)